Aviator Monument or Aviators' Monument is the name of the following monuments:
Aviator Monument (Warsaw)
Aviator Monument (Stockholm)
Monument to the Heroes of the Air, Romania